The RRS James Cook is a British Royal Research Ship operated by the Natural Environment Research Council (NERC). She was built in 2006 to replace the ageing RRS Charles Darwin with funds from Britain's NERC and the DTI's Large Scientific Facilities Fund. She was named after Captain James Cook, the British explorer, navigator and cartographer at the National Oceanography Centre, Southampton by The Princess Royal.

On her maiden scientific voyage, on 5 March 2007, the James Cook set off to study the Fifteen-Twenty Fracture Zone.

James Cook was involved in the discovery of what is believed to be the world's deepest undersea volcanic vents, while in the Caribbean in 2010.

In September 2015, while on a cruise studying the seabed and marine life of the Whittard Canyon on the northern margin of the Bay of Biscay, oceanographers pictured what they believe was the first blue whale in English waters since the mammals were almost hunted to extinction in the north-east Atlantic.

In January 2020 she left Fort Lauderdale to take part in the Go-Ship programme of scientific expeditions, studying the changes in the physical and chemical make-up of the North Atlantic as a result of anthropogenic warming. The voyage ended at Tenerife in early March.

See also
 RV Neil Armstrong - United States equivalent

References

External links 

 Skipsteknisk AS Design ST-345
 National Oceanography Centre - Sea Systems - RRS James Cook, Southampton
 Movie of the hull launch of the RRS James Cook in Gdansk, Poland

Natural Environment Research Council
Oceanographic instrumentation
Research vessels of the United Kingdom
2005 ships
Ships built in Gdańsk